Beta-Lactamase Database may refer to:

 Beta-Lactamase Database (BLAD)
 Beta-Lactamase Database (BLDB)